Velòdrom d'Horta is a velodrome located in Barcelona, Catalonia, Spain. It was the track cycling venue for the 1992 Summer Olympics and was also the venue for the UCI Track Cycling World Championships in 1984.

The velodrome, designed by Esteve Bonell and Francesc Rius, was built in 1984 as the first of Barcelona's construction projects in preparation for the bid for the 1992 Summer Olympics in 1986. It was the first velodrome built to new FIAC rules permitting a  track if surfaced with wood. The building won the FAD architecture prize in 1985.

It was the last permanent open-air velodrome used for Olympic Track Cycling events (Atlanta's velodrome at Stone Mountain in 1996 was temporary). Olympic velodromes have been built with a roof since 2000.

References
1992 Summer Olympics official report. Volume 2. pp. 234–8.

Sports venues in Barcelona
Cycle racing in Catalonia
Velodromes in Spain
Venues of the 1992 Summer Olympics
Olympic cycling venues
Sports venues completed in 1984
1984 establishments in Spain